Charles Howden (22 October 1881 – 9 October 1963) was a New Zealand cricketer. He played thirteen first-class matches for Otago between 1902 and 1909.

See also
 List of Otago representative cricketers

References

External links
 

1881 births
1963 deaths
New Zealand cricketers
Otago cricketers
Cricketers from Dunedin
New Zealand people of Scottish descent
South Island cricketers